Charles Loring may refer to:
Charles J. Loring, Jr. (1918–1952), United States Air Force officer and Medal of Honor recipient
Charles M. Loring (1833–1922), American businessman, miller, father of Minneapolis park system
Charles Harding Loring (1828–1907), American mechanical engineer
Charles Loring (judge) (1873–1961), chief justice of the Minnesota Supreme Court